The University of Duisburg-Essen is a public research university in North Rhine-Westphalia, Germany. In the 2019 Times Higher Education World University Rankings, the university was awarded 194th place in the world. It was originally founded in 1654 and re-established on 1 January 2003, as a merger of the Gerhard Mercator University of Duisburg and the university of Essen. It is based in both the cities of Duisburg and Essen, and a part of University Alliance Metropolis Ruhr.

With its 12 departments and around 40,000 students, the University of Duisburg-Essen is among the 10 largest German universities. Since 2014, research income has risen by 150 percent. Natural science and engineering are ranked within the top 10 in Germany, and the humanities are within the top 20 to 30. Especially, the physics field is ranked in the top 1 in Germany.

History

Origins: University of Duisburg (1555) 
The university's origins date back to the 1555 decision of Duke Wilhelm V von Jülich-Kleve-Berg, to create a university for the unified duchies at the Lower Rhine. To this end, it was necessary to obtain a permission of the emperor and the pope. Although the permission of the pope was granted in 1564 and of the emperor in 1566, the university was founded about ninety years later in 1654, after the acquisition of the Duchy of Cleves by Frederick William, Elector of Brandenburg. It opened on 14 October 1655 by Johannes Claudberg as their first rector. The university had four faculties: Theology, Medicine, Law and Arts. During its period of activity it was one of the central and leading universities of the western provinces of Prussia.

Only a few decades later the university was in competition with the much better equipped Dutch universities. Since only about one third of the population in the western provinces of Prussia were member of The Reformed Church, most Lutheran and Catholic citizens in the second half of the 18th century sent their sons to other universities.

The university declined rapidly and was closed on 18 October 1818, due to a Cabinet Order of Friedrich Wilhelm III. At the same time, the University of Bonn was founded. Large parts of the Duisburg University Library were relocated to Bonn and formed the basis of the newly formed Bonn Library. The sceptre of the University of Duisburg was given to the University of Bonn, where it is still located today.

In 1891, the Rheinisch-Westfälische Hüttenschule was relocated from Bochum to Duisburg. Subsequently, the school was transformed into the Königlich-Preußischen Maschinenbau- und Hüttenschule, and in 1938 was renamed to Public School of Engineering.

After a decision of the federal state government in 1960, the teacher training college of Kettwig was settled to Duisburg and was named Pedagogical University Ruhr. In 1968, the university was founded again in Duisburg, related to the old one, bearing the name: Comprehensive University of Duisburg. Initially only small, the university was developed rapidly in the 1970s up to about 15,000 students. In 1972 the Pedagogical University Ruhr and the Public School of Engineering, which was renamed in 1971 to University of applied sciences Duisburg. Other schools were also relocated to Duisburg. The University of Duisburg was then called Comprehensive University of Duisburg. In 1994 the university was renamed Gerhard Mercator University.

In 2003, Gerhard Mercator University merged with the University of Essen to form the University of Duisburg-Essen, which is today one of the largest universities in Germany with about 40,000 students.

Recent developments 
In March 2007 the three universities of Bochum, Dortmund and Duisburg-Essen founded the University Alliance Metropolis Ruhr, which now includes more than 120,00 students and 1,300 professors and is modelled after the University of California system.

In May 2018, the three members of the University Alliance Metropolis Ruhr launched the Research Academy Ruhr (RAR), an inter- and university overarching program for the development and support of young scientists. The program is funded by the State of North Rhine-Westfalia (NRW) and the Mercator Research Center Ruhr (MERCUR) with €800,000 over the next four years and an additional €1 million being added by the three participating members of the University Alliance.

Campus 

The university has two main campus locations in Duisburg and Essen.

Faculties and Institutes

Main faculties 
The University of Duisburg-Essen today has twelve faculties, listed below:
 Faculty of Art and Design
 Faculty of Biology and Geography
 Faculty of Business Administration and Economics
 Mercator School of Management – Faculty of Business Administration
 Faculty of Chemistry
 Faculty of Engineering
 Department of Building sciences
 Department of Electrical engineering and Information technology
 Department of Computer sciences and Applied Cognitive Sciences
 Department of Mechanical and Process engineering
 Department of Transport Systems and Logistics
 International Studies in Engineering
 Faculty of Humanities
 Faculty of Mathematics
 Faculty of Medicine and University Hospital Essen
 Faculty of Social sciences
 Institute for Political Sciences
NRW School of Governance
 Institute for Educational sciences
 Institute for Development and Peace (INEF – Institut für Entwicklung und Frieden)
 Institute for Sociology
 Faculty of Physics

Central scientific institutes 
 Centre for Nanointegration Duisburg-Essen (CeNIDE) (German)
 German-French Institute for Automation and Robotics (IAR)
 Erwin L. Hahn Institute for Magnetic Resonance Imaging
 Essen College of Gender Studies (EKfG)
 Institute for Experimental Mathematics (IEM)
 Institute for Advanced Study in the Humanities
 Institute of East Asian Studies (IN-EAST)
 Institute for Labor/ Labour and Qualification (IAQ)
 Interdisciplinary center for analytics on the nanoscale (ICAN)
 Centre for Logistics and Transport (ZLV)
 Centre for Medical Biotechnology (ZMB)
 Centre for Water and Environmental Research (ZMU)
 Centre for empirical research in education (ZeB)

The NRW School of Governance 
The NRW School of Governance is a central institution within the Institute for Political science and was founded in 2006 under the direction of Karl-Rudolf Korte.

It aims, through research and teaching, to promote the scientifically sound understanding of political processes (in North Rhine-Westphalia).

It does so by educating and training students in three main programs:

 Masters program: "Political management, Public policy and Public administration"
 Part-time masters program: "Public Policy" 
 Doctoral School: Scholarship and Excellence Programs at the Department of Political Science

and also through the use of various other education modules.

Associated institutes 
 paluno, The Ruhr Institute for Software Technology
 German Textile Research Centre North-west (DTNW)
 Development Centre for Ship Technology and Transport Systems (DST)
 Asia-Pacific Economic Research Institute (FIP)
 Institute of Energy and Environmental Technology (IUTA)
 Institute for Labor/ Labour and Qualification (IAQ)
 Institute of Mobile and Satellite Communication Technology (IMST)
 Institute for Prevention and Health Promotion (IPG)
 Institute of Science and Ethics (IWE)
 IWW Water Centre (IWW)
 Rhine-Ruhr Institute for Social Research and Political Consulting (RISP)
 Salomon Ludwig Steinheim Institute for German-Jewish History (StI)
 Centre for Fuel Cell Technology (ZBT)

The university has a Confucius Institute.

Student body 

 it is the German university with the largest number of Chinese international students. Overall, it has a 16% composition of international students. The majority of such students are enrolled as engineering or economics majors.

People

Rectors 
 01.2003–09.2003 – Heiner Kleffner, Founding commissioner and head of section 
 10.2003–12.2006 – Lothar Zechlin, Founding rector
 01.2007–03.2008 – Lothar Zechlin, 1. rector
 04.2008–03.2022 – Ulrich Radtke, 2. rector
 04.2022 – Barbara Albert

Mercator-Professorship Award 
The University of Duisburg-Essen awards the Mercator-Professur to individuals who are well known for their social and scientific engagement. So far, recipients of the Mercator-Professur have been:
 1997: Hans-Dietrich Genscher, politician (FDP), former Foreign Minister and Vice-Chancellor of Germany
 1998: Siegfried Lenz, writer
 1999: Jan Philipp Reemtsma, literary scholar.
 2000: Jutta Limbach, jurist and politician (SPD)
 2001: Volker Schlöndorff, filmmaker.
 2002: Ulrich Wickert, journalist, chief anchor for tagesthemen
 2003: Daniel Goeudevert French writer, management consultant.
 2004: Walter Kempowski, writer.
 2005: Richard von Weizsäcker, politician (CDU), former President of the Federal Republic of Germany.
 2006: Necla Kelek, social scientist
 2007: Hanan Ashrawi, legislator, activist, and scholar
 2008: Christiane Nüsslein-Volhard, biologist, winner of the Nobel Prize in Physiology or Medicine
 2009: Peter Scholl-Latour, journalist and publicist
 2010: Alice Schwarzer, publisher and feminist
 2011: Udo Di Fabio, former judge of the Federal Constitutional Court
 2012: Wolfgang Huber, Bishop, former Chairman of the Council of the EKD
 2013: Margarethe von Trotta, film director.
 2015: Götz Werner, founder of dm-drogerie markt
 2016: Karl Lehmann, Cardinal prelate, former Chairman of the Conference of the German Bishops

Further professors include Jette Joop, Kai Krause and Bruce Ames.

Poets in Residence 
The institution of the poet in residence is not missing at any university in the USA. In Germany, the University of Duisburg-Essen was the first and, for a long time, only university that followed the American example and brought contemporary authors to the university as guest lecturers for readings and seminars. In 1975, Martin Walser was the first poet in residence to hold his poetics lectures in Essen.

Since the summer semester 2000, the following personalities have worked as poet in residence at the University of Essen (later Duisburg-Essen):

 Ss 2000: Emine Sevgi Özdamar
 Ws 2000/01: Kirsten Boie
 Ss 2001: Volker Braun
 Ws 2001/02: Robert Gernhardt
 Ss 2002: Mike Nicol
 Ss 2003: Friedrich Christian Delius
 Ws 2003/04: Brigitte Burmeister
 Ss 2004: Georg Klein
 Ws 2004/05: Andreas Steinhöfel
 Ss 2005: Yōko Tawada
 Ws 2005/06: Dagmar Leupold
 Ss 2006: Friedrich Ani
 Ws 2006/07: Hans-Ulrich Treichel
 Ss 2007: Terézia Mora
 Ws 2007/08: Zafer Şenocak
 Ss 2008: Jürgen Lodemann
 Ws 2009/10: Klaus Händl
 Ws 2010/11: Judith Kuckart
 Ss 2011: Norbert Hummelt
 Ws 2011/12: Norbert Scheuer
 Ss 2012: Guy Helminger
 Ws 2012/13: Reinhard Jirgl
 Ss 2013: Antje Rávic Strubel
 Ws 2013/14: Bernhard Jaumann
 Ws 2014/15: Kathrin Röggla
 Ss 2015: Marion Poschmann
 Ws 2016/16: Klaus Modick
 Ss 2016: Lukas Bärfuss
 Ws 2016/17: Dorothee Elmiger, Reto Hänny
 Ss 2017: Christof Hamann

Academics

International cooperation

Erasmus program 
The university is part of the ERASMUS exchange program.

International university cooperations 
The university also cooperates with several other international institutions of higher education.

University of Duisburg-Essen (UDE)'s main partner universities

University of Duisburg-Essen (UDE)'s faculty partner institutions 
Besides the main partnering universities, various faculty of the University Essen-Duisburg also cooperate with international universities and specific faculties or programmes (click "show" to expand).

University Alliance Metropolis Ruhr 
As part of the University Alliance Metropolis Ruhr network the university is involved in running three liaison offices in Moscow, New York City and São Paulo. The offices aim to foster international academic exchange between the local and Ruhr area and are responsible for their respective continents.

International network 
The university is also part of the AURORA Network of European universities.

Further cooperation programmes 
The university is part of the IS:link (Information Systems Student Exchange Network), the VDAC (Verband der Deutsch-Amerikanischen Clubs / Federation of German-American Clubs e.V.) and offers the internationally oriented, doctoral programme "ARUS – Advanced Research in Urban Systems", which is based on previous academic achievements in selected fields within the Joint Centre "Urban Systems".

Rankings
Source:

In Germany, there is no comprehensive university ranking because of the standardization of the universities in Germany, sharply contrasting to the university system in USA and UK. However, the institute for evaluation of universities in Germany has reported the ranking of the departments annually. In this ranking, University of Duisburg-Essen is ranked in a high position in the science and engineering field. Especially, the department of physics is ranked as the top 1 university in Germany.

Measured by the number of top managers in the German economy, University of Duisburg-Essen ranked 15th in 2019.

Considering their rankings in the Times Higher Education World University Rankings citation index from 2019, the University of Duisburg-Essen ranks fifth in Germany, behind Heidelberg, the Berlin Charité, Ulm and Hohenheim, thus displaying its particular scientific success and high productivity. In an international comparison of the universities most frequently cited in scientific publications, the University of Duisburg-Essen is in 103rd place. Overall, the University of Duisburg-Essen has steadily improved its position in the Times Higher Education World University Rankings, making it one of the 200 best universities in the world. In the Times Higher Education Young University Ranking, it is ranked 14th worldwide in 2019.

In May 2018 the Centrum für Hochschulentwicklung (CHE – Center for Higher Education Development) rankings placed the university in the top ranks in different categories and fields, like the Physics department for seminar and lecture content and Biology, Computer Science, Math, Medicine and Sports for excellent programs and support in the early stages of starting at Essen-Duisburg.

In the European Commission funded U-Multirank system the university as a whole was ranked as "excellent" in the research categories "External research income", "Top cited publications", "Post-doc positions", in the knowledge transfer categories "Income from private sources", "Spin-offs" and "Publications cited in patents". In the category international orientation Essen-Duisburg was rated "excellent" for their "International academic staff".

Notable people

Alumni 
Notable alumni of the university include:

Gorden Wagener, German car designer, and is the chief design officer for Daimler AG
Cornelius Boersch, serial entrepreneur and business angel
Osagie Ehanire, Nigerian medical doctor and politician
Peter Bialobrzeski, photographer and a professor of photography
Rainer Blasczyk, physician for transfusion medicine 
Bärbel Höhn, German politician
Moritz Körner, German politician
Andreas Gursky, German artist and photographer
Ina Hartwig, German writer, literature critic and academic lecturer
Klaus-Dieter Hungenberg, German chemist
Petra Kammerevert, German politician
Suzie Kerstgens, German singer
Dieter Nuhr, German cabaret artist
Hannelore Kraft, German politician and Prime Minister of North Rhine-Westfalia (NRW)
Frank T. Rothaermel, American academic

Points of interest 
 Botanischer Garten der Universität Duisburg-Essen, the university's botanical garden in Essen

See also 
Official website
ConRuhr

References

Further reading 
 30 Jahre Universität Essen (Essener Universitätsreden, Heft 10, Akademisches Jahr 2001/02), Universität Essen 2002 (Beiträge aus der Vortragsreihe "Wurzeln der Universität")
 Claus Bussmann, Holger Heith: Chronik 1972–1997. Chronik der ersten 25 Lebensjahre der Gerhard-Mercator-Universität/GH Duisburg, die als Gesamthochschule Duisburg das Licht der Welt erblickte, Duisburg 1997, 
 Dieter Geuenich, Irmgard Hantsche (Hrsg.): Zur Geschichte der Universität Duisburg 1655–1818 (Duisburger Forschungen 53), Duisburg 2007
 Helmut Schrey: Die Universität Duisburg. Geschichte und Gegenwart. Traditionen, Personen, Probleme, Duisburg 1982,

External links 

  
 Official website of the University of Duisburg-Essen 
 UAMR – University Alliance Metropolis Ruhr

 
University of Duisburg-Essen
University of Duisburg-Essen
Universities and colleges in North Rhine-Westphalia
Educational institutions established in the 1640s
1818 disestablishments
Educational institutions established in 2003
1654 establishments in the Holy Roman Empire
Universities and colleges formed by merger in Germany
2003 establishments in Germany